Video denoising is the process of removing noise from a video signal. Video denoising methods can be divided into:
 Spatial video denoising methods, where image noise reduction is applied to each frame individually.
 Temporal video denoising methods, where noise between frames is reduced. Motion compensation may be used to avoid ghosting artifacts when blending together pixels from several frames.
 Spatial-temporal video denoising methods use a combination of spatial and temporal denoising. This is often referred to as 3D denoising.

It is done in two areas:

They are chroma and luminance, chroma noise is where one see color fluctuations and luminance is where one see light/dark fluctuations. Generally, the luminance noise looks more like film grain while chroma noise looks more unnatural or digital like.

Video denoising methods are designed and tuned for specific types of noise. 
Typical video noise types are following:
 Analog noise
 Radio channel artifacts
 High frequency interference (dots, short horizontal color lines, etc.)
 Brightness and color channel interference (problems with antenna)
 Video reduplication – false contouring appearance
 VHS artifacts
 Color-specific degradation
 Brightness and color channel interference (specific type for VHS)
 Chaotic line shift at the end of frame (lines resync signal misalignment)
 Wide horizontal noise strips (old VHS or obstruction of magnetic heads)
 Film artifacts (see also Film preservation)
 Dust, dirt, spray
 Scratches
 Curling (emulsion exfoliation)
 Fingerprints
 Digital noise
 Blocking – low bitrate artifacts
 Ringing – low and medium bitrates artifact especially on animated cartoons
 Blocks (slices) damage in case of losses in digital transmission channel or disk injury (scratches on DVD)

Different suppression methods are used to remove all these artifacts from video.

See also 
 Image denoising

References

External links 

 Reduce noise in video

Noise reduction
Video
Video processing
Video signal